Matilde Ceballos (born 14 March 1957) is a Panamanian weightlifter. He competed in the men's featherweight event at the 1992 Summer Olympics.

References

1957 births
Living people
Panamanian male weightlifters
Olympic weightlifters of Panama
Weightlifters at the 1992 Summer Olympics
Central American and Caribbean Games medalists in weightlifting
Place of birth missing (living people)
20th-century Panamanian people
21st-century Panamanian people